William Turner may refer to:

Artists
 William Turner (1762–1835), one of the English Turner family of potters; see Turner (potters)
 J. M. W. Turner (William Turner, 1775–1851), major English Romantic landscape painter, watercolourist and printmaker
 William Turner (painter) (1789–1862), English watercolour painter from Oxford
 William Greene Turner (1833–1917), American sculptor
 William Lakin Turner (1867–1936), English landscape artist
 William Ralph Turner (1920–2013), English painter

Politicians
 William Turner (Blackburn MP) (1777–1842), British Member of Parliament for Blackburn
 William Turner (London MP) (1615–1693), British Member of Parliament for City of London and Lord Mayor of London
 William D. Turner (1836–1905), Wisconsin State Assemblyman
 William George Turner (1872–1937), Irish Lord Mayor of Belfast
 William Turner (Australian politician) (1837–1916), New South Wales politician
 William H. Turner (politician), African-American school board member and state senator from Miami, Florida
 William V. Turner, state representative in Alabama during the Reconstruction era

Religious figures
 William Turner (bishop of Buffalo) (1871–1936), Irish-American Roman Catholic bishop
 William Turner (bishop of Galloway) (1844–1914), Scottish Roman Catholic bishop
 William Turner (bishop of Salford) (1799–1872), English Roman Catholic bishop and vicar apostolic
 William Turner (minister at Wakefield) (1714–1794), English dissenting divine
 William Turner (Unitarian minister) (1761–1859), English minister; Hanover Square congregation, Newcastle upon Tyne, son of the minister at Wakefield of the same name

Scientists
 William Turner (naturalist) (c. 1508–1568), English ornithologist and botanist; dean of Wells Cathedral
 William Turner Thiselton-Dyer (1843–1928), British botanist
 W. E. S. Turner (William Ernest Stephen Turner, 1881–1963), English chemist and glass technologist
 William Wadden Turner (1810–1859), British-born American linguist and librarian

Sportspeople
 Bill Turner (basketball) (born 1944), American basketball player
 Billy Turner (American football) (born 1991), American football player
 Billy Turner (William H. Turner Jr., 1940–2021), American racehorse trainer
 Willie Turner (sprinter) (born 1948), American sprinter
 Willie Turner (footballer) (c.1860–?), Scottish international footballer
 William Turner (footballer, born 1867) (1867–?), Welsh international footballer
 Bill Turner (footballer, born 1870) (1870–1952), Australian rules footballer for St Kilda
 Bill Turner (footballer, born 1894) (1894–1970), English footballer
 Bill Turner (English footballer, born 1901) (1901–1989), British footballer 
 Bill Turner (Australian footballer, born 1901) (1901–1967), Australian rules footballer for Fitzroy
 Bill Turner (footballer, born 1912) (1912–1981), Australian rules footballer for Essendon
 Aggie Turner (William Turner, 1893–1916), American baseball player

Others
 William Turner (anatomist) (1832–1916), Scottish academic
 William Turner (biographer) (1788–1853), son of the English Unitarian minister of the same name
 William Turner (composer) (1651–1740), baroque English composer
 William Turner (envoy) (1792–1867), British diplomat and author
 William B. Turner (1892–1918), U.S. Army officer and Medal of Honor recipient
 William J. G. Turner (also known as Bill Turner; 1952–1987), American composer and stage director
 William Thomas Turner (1856–1933), final captain of the RMS Lusitania
 William Turner (British Army officer) (1907–1989)
 William F. Turner (1816–1899), judge in the Territory of Arizona
 William H. Turner (actor) (1861–1942), Irish actor 
 William Irving Turner (1890–1950), American architect
 William Aldren Turner (1864–1945), neurologist
 William Iredell Turner (1812–1881), Florida pioneer and soldier
 William Turner, 18-year-old lynching victim from Helena, Phillips County, Arkansas
 Bill Turner (public servant) (1887–1959), Australian public servant; Comptroller-General of Customs

In fiction
 Bootstrap Bill Turner, father of Will Turner in Disney's Pirates of the Caribbean films
 Will Turner, fictional character in Disney's Pirates of the Caribbean films